Kamal Ibrahim (كمال ابراهيم; born January 10, 1961) is a former Egyptian wrestler.

Ibrahim was 6-2.5 (190 cm) tall and weighed 198 lbs (90 kg) when he competed in the Olympics.

Wrestling career
He competed for Egypt at the 1984 Summer Olympics in Los Angeles as a Men's Light-Heavyweight in Greco-Roman Wrestling.  He was defeated by Evan Bernstein of Israel in the first round, received a bye in the second round, beat Roberto Neves Filho of Brazil in the third round, and lost to Georgios Poikilidis of Greece in the fourth round.

Ibrahim also competed for Egypt at the 1988 Summer Olympics in Seoul in the same event. He lost to Uwe Sachs of West Germany in the first round, and Ilie Matei of Romania in the second round.

References

External links
 

1961 births
Living people
Egyptian male sport wrestlers
Olympic wrestlers of Egypt
Wrestlers at the 1984 Summer Olympics
Wrestlers at the 1988 Summer Olympics